The International Military Sports Council (IMSC) or Conseil International du Sport Militaire (CISM), is an international sports association, established in 1948 and headquartered in Brussels. It is the world's second-largest multi-discipline sports organisation, after the International Olympic Committee, holding more than 20 competitions annually. Under its auspices, soldiers who may previously have met on the battlefield compete on the sports playing field. CISM organises various sporting events, including the Military World Games and World Military Championships, for the armed forces of 140 member countries. The aim of CISM is to promote sport activity and physical education between armed forces as a means to foster world peace. The motto of CISM is "Friendship through Sport" and is based on three pillars of sport, education and solidarity. 

Since 21 April 2018, the president of CISM has been Commissaire aux sports militaires Hervé Piccirillo of France, while the General Secretariat is under the management of the Secretary General, Colonel Mamby Koita of Guinea.

History

Before the CISM
In 1919, in the aftermath of the First World War, the Inter-Allied Games were organised by General John Pershing's Allied Forces Sports Council, bringing together 1500 athletes representing 18 nations, to compete in 24 sports. The event was held in Joinville-le-Pont in France.

In May 1946, after the Second World War, the Allied Forces Sports Council was revived by Colonel Henri Debrus and Olympic pentathlete Major Raoul Mollet, and over the weekend of 7-8 September that year, the second Inter-Allied Games took place in Berlin, at the Olympiastadion, venue of the 1936 Olympic Games. The event was also known as the Allied Track and Field Championships, following a similar event in 1945. Twelve nations were due to be represented: Belgium, Czechoslovakia, Denmark, Great Britain, Poland, Greece, Luxembourg, Holland, Norway, the Soviet Union, the United States and hosts Germany, while reports say that only seven did.

Amid some rancour, the Allied Forces Sports Council was extinguished in 1947.

Main development
A few months later, taking up they had left off with the Allied Forces Sports Council, Colonel Debrus and Major Mollet founded the CISM, on 18 February 1948. The founding members were Belgium, Denmark, France, Luxembourg and the Netherlands. In 1950, Argentina and Egypt became members. In 1951, the United States joined. In 1952, Iraq, Lebanon, Pakistan and Syria became members, followed two years later by Brazil. Canada came on board in 1985. Then in 1991, with the end of the Cold War, the rival Warsaw Pact organisation Allied Armies Sports Committee (SKDA) merged with CISM, heralding the accession of 31 new member countries from the Pact and others associated with the Soviet Bloc. This rapid progress led to recognition by international institutions including the IOC. Prior to 1995, CISM organised 15 to 20 world championships each year. Since 1995, CISM has organised every four years the Military World Games, a multi-sport event.

CISM of the Americas
The CISM of the Americas Continent is a subordinate organisation that consists of 19 member nations: Argentina, Barbados, Bolivia, Brazil, Canada, Chile, Colombia, Dominican Republic, Ecuador, Guatemala, Guyana, Jamaica, Paraguay, Peru, Suriname, Trinidad and Tobago, United States of America, Uruguay and Venezuela.   There are two liaison offices known as the North American Liaison Office (NALO) and the South American Liaison Office (SALO). The CISM of the Americas Vice President, (Army) Colonel Walter Jander served as one of the four CISM Vice Presidents (2015 - 2019).

CISM Honors and Awards

Goals and organisation

Solidarity
The CISM Solidarity programme is intended as a means to promote sustainable development to strengthen less privileged CISM member countries, in order to create equal opportunities for all CISM nations to participate in CISM events.

Developed some decades ago, Solidarity is one of the two pillars that guide CISM's activities, and inspired the Olympic solidarity model. CISM's solidarity programme has many components, ranging from organising technical clinics in less privileged countries and transporting athletes to championships, to shipping sports equipment to disadvantaged regions. Member countries may send or invite coaches, based either on CISM membership and "Friendship through Sport" or often through bilateral contracts.

The establishment of Regional Development Centres (RDC) is a major objective of the CISM support policy. The first step in this direction was taken in 2006 when the CISM African Development Centre (CAD) was founded in Nairobi, Kenya. A further Regional Development Centre was established in Rio de Janeiro, Brazil.

General Assembly
A General Assembly, on which all member nations are represented, is the supreme authority of CISM.

CISM Presidents

Board of Directors

CISM events

Military World Games 

The Military World Games are a multisports event organised every four years since 1995. They are held one year before the year the Olympic Games are organised.   
The 1st Military World Games 1995 Military World Games was held in Rome, Italy from 4 to 16 September 1995; 93 nations competed in 17 different sporting events to celebrate the 50th anniversary of the Second World War and of the ratification of the United Nations Organization Charter.
In August 1999, the 2nd Military World Games 1999 Military World Games was held in Zagreb, Croatia; 7000 participants from 82 nations competed in 20 sports. 
In December 2003, the 3rd Military World Games 2003 Military World Games was held in Catania, Italy; Participants from 84 different nations competed in 13 sports.
In October 2007, the 4th Military World Games 2007 Military World Games was held in Hyderabad, India; Participants from 101 countries competed in 14 sports. 
In July 2011, the 5th Military World Games 2011 Military World Games was held in Rio de Janeiro, Brazil; Participants from 108 countries competed in 20 sports. Brazil topped the medal table with 45 gold, 33 silver and 36 bronze. China was second with 37 gold, 28 silver and 34 bronze. Italy captured 14 gold, 13 silver and 24 bronze to round out the top three. 
In October 2015, the 6th Military World Games 2015 Military World Games was held in Mungyeong, South Korea; Participants from 105 countries, more 15 as observer, competed in 24 sports, including five military sports. Russia topped the medal table with 59 gold, 43 silver and 33 bronze. Brazil was the second with 34 gold, 26 silver and 24 bronze. China captured 32 gold, 31 silver and 35 bronze to round out the top three. 
In 2019, the 7th CISM World Games took place in Wuhan, China.

World Military Championships

In the year of the Military World Games (from 1995, every four years), championship shall be the same of the World Games tournament.

Sports

CISM annually organises over twenty Military World Championships for different sports in which all member nations can take part. They also organize continental and regional competitions and every four years the Military World Games are held. This is a multisports event which is organized by CISM in conjunction with CISM member nations.
The sports include: basketball; bowling, boxing, cross country running, cycling, golf, judo, lifesaving, marathon, modern pentathlon, orienteering, parachuting, rugby football, sailing, shooting, skiing, soccer, softball, swimming, taekwondo, track and field, triathlon, volleyball, beach volleyball, and wrestling.

Other activities

Symposia

CISM strives to organise international symposia at least every year to study various aspects of physical education and sport within member states' armed forces. In 2008, was the symposium about "How to emphasize the importance of sports within the Armed Forces at national and international level" took place in Sofia, Bulgaria 24-25 September 2008. A symposium on "Sports science: fundamental tool of modern sports management" in Prague 18-23 September 2009 was attended by 70 participants from 27 countries, and saw the relaunch of the CISM Academy.

Sport for Peace

In 2005, CISM organised the seminar "Sport and peace" which was held in Mantova, Italy. Representatives from more than 22 countries, International Organizations, IOC, UN, UNICEF, Sports Associations, CISM Member Nations and organizations directly dealing with peace, health, sport and education attended the Seminar.

In October 2007, during the 4th Military World Games in India, CISM organised in partnership with the IOC, the Indian Olympic Association and the Organising Committee of the World Games, an International Forum on Sport for Peace, with the theme: "Sport, a concrete fundamental tool to promote Peace".

This year, on 20 March, in the framework of the Winter Games, CISM organized in close cooperation with IOC, the International Forum on the subject Sport for Peace – "From positive initiatives to systemic integrated programs".

Forum participants signed a declaration "CISM Aosta Call-to-Action 2010 on Sport for Peace" summarising the common wishes and asking all institutions to formally establish a bilateral and mutual agreement in order to undertake concrete programmes aimed at sharing good practices and effectively implementing Sport for Peace programmes.

Women in sport
Canada was the first country to include women’s categories while hosting Taekwondo in 1993, had the first female sport committee president (sailing) and also hosted the 1st Women in CISM Week in Kingston in 2008.

See also

 World Military Basketball Championship
 World Military Cross Country Championships
 World Military Cup
 World Military Pentathlon Championship
 World Military Track and Field Championships
 Military World Games
 Military sports
 List of shooting sports organizations

References

External links

International sports organizations
Military sports governing bodies
Military World Games
Sports organizations established in 1948
International organisations based in Belgium
Shooting sports organizations